Ahmed Mohamed Jewel (also Jewel Ahmed, born August 14, 1983) is a Bangladeshi former swimmer, who specialized in sprint freestyle events. Ahmed qualified for the men's 50 m freestyle at the 2004 Summer Olympics in Athens, without having an entry time. He challenged five other swimmers in heat one, including 16-year-old Emile Rony Bakale of Congo. He posted both a lifetime best and a Bangladeshi record of 25.47 to earn a second spot by four tenths of a second (0.40) behind winner Bakale. Ahmed failed to advance into the semifinals, as he placed sixty-third overall out of 86 swimmers in the preliminaries.

References

External links
 

1983 births
Living people
Bangladeshi male freestyle swimmers
Olympic swimmers of Bangladesh
Swimmers at the 2004 Summer Olympics
Sportspeople from Dhaka
Swimmers at the 2006 Asian Games
Asian Games competitors for Bangladesh
South Asian Games silver medalists for Bangladesh
South Asian Games bronze medalists for Bangladesh
South Asian Games medalists in swimming